Lynda Chyzyk is a Canadian para-alpine skier. She represented Canada at the 1984 Winter Paralympics and at the 1988 Winter Paralympics. In total she won one gold medal, one silver medal and two bronze medals.

In 1984, she won the silver medal in the Women's Giant Slalom LW2 event and the bronze medals in the Women's Downhill LW2 and the Women's Alpine Combination LW2 events. In 1988, she won one more medal: the gold medal in the Women's Slalom LW2 event. She also competed in the Women's Downhill LW2 event and finished in 4th place.

See also 
 List of Paralympic medalists in alpine skiing

References 

Living people
Year of birth missing (living people)
Place of birth missing (living people)
Paralympic alpine skiers of Canada
Alpine skiers at the 1984 Winter Paralympics
Alpine skiers at the 1988 Winter Paralympics
Medalists at the 1984 Winter Paralympics
Medalists at the 1988 Winter Paralympics
Paralympic gold medalists for Canada
Paralympic silver medalists for Canada
Paralympic bronze medalists for Canada
Paralympic medalists in alpine skiing
Canadian female alpine skiers
Canadian amputees